Terry Grant (born October 25, 1963, Stevenage, United Kingdom) is a stunt driver who performs at live events around the world. He is married to Carol Grant and father of Perry Grant, Scott Grant and Laura Grant. He is the holder of multiple world-records, including having executed the highest loop-the-loop in a car, the fastest two-wheel mile, the furthest barrel roll jump, the most doughnuts standing on the roof of a car, and the highest number of doughnuts in 100 seconds.

References

British stunt performers
World record holders
Living people
1963 births